= 2001–02 Campionato Sammarinese Femminile =

1. REDIRECT Draft:2001–02 Campionato Sammarinese Femminile
